Miguel Ángel Deras  is a retired Salvadoran footballer and manager.

Club career
Nicknamed Chincuya, Deras won six league titles with Quequeisque from 1940-1946.

References

Possibly living people
El Salvador international footballers
Salvadoran footballers
Expatriate footballers in Mexico
Salvadoran football managers
Year of birth missing (living people)
Association football forwards